American rapper Chance the Rapper is the recipient of numerous awards including three Grammy Awards, three BET Awards, two BET Hip Hop Awards, two iHeartRadio Music Awards and a Soul Train Music Award.

Awards and nominations

Notes

References

Chance the Rapper
Chance the Rapper